INRB can mean:

 Institut National pour la Recherche Biomedicale, a medical research institute in the Democratic Republic of the Congo
 Instituto Nacional dos Recursos Biológicos, the Portuguese state-run institute for research on biological resources